Encephalartos middelburgensis is a species of cycad that is native to Gauteng and Mpumalanga provinces of South Africa at elevations of 1100–1400 meters.

Description
It is a cycad with an arborescent habit, with an erect or decumbent stem, up to 10 m tall and 35-45 cm in diameter, often with secondary stems originating from basal suckers.
The leaves, pinnate, arranged in a crown at the apex of the stem, are 1.2-1.5 m long, supported by a 30-40 cm long petiole with a densely tomentose base, and composed of numerous pairs of lanceolate, leathery leaflets, up to 20 cm long, with entire margin or occasionally with a single spine on the inferior margin and sharp apex.
It is a dioecious species, with male specimens that have from 1 to 8 cylindrical or strictly ovoid cones, erect, 30–55 cm long and 8–12 cm broad, green in color and covered with a brownish tomentum, and female specimens with 1- 6 cylindrical cones, about 35–45 cm long and 17–20 cm wide, the same color as the male cones.
The seeds are coarsely ovoid, 3–3.5 cm long, covered with a yellow to brown sarcotesta.

References

External links
PlantZAfrica.com article
 
 

middelburgensis
Plants described in 1989
Flora of the Northern Provinces